The Western Group of Forces (WGF), previously known as the Group of Soviet Occupation Forces in Germany (GSOFG) and the Group of Soviet Forces in Germany (GSFG), were the troops of the Soviet Army in East Germany. The Group of Soviet Occupation Forces in Germany was formed after the end of World War II in Europe from units of the 1st and 2nd Belorussian Fronts. The group helped suppress the East German uprising of 1953. After the end of occupation functions in 1954 the group was renamed the Group of Soviet Forces in Germany. The group represented Soviet interests in East Germany during the Cold War. After changes in Soviet foreign policy during the late 1980s, the group shifted to a more defensive role and in 1988 became the Western Group of Forces. Russian forces remained in the eastern part of Germany after the dissolution of the Soviet Union and German reunification until 1994.

History

The Group of Soviet Occupation Forces, Germany was formed after the end of World War II in Europe from formations of the 1st and 2nd Belorussian Fronts, commanded by Georgy Zhukov. On its creation on 9 June 1945 it included:

 the Soviet 1st Guards Tank Army (HQ Radebeul) · 8th Guards Mechanised Corps, the 11th Guards Tank Corps
 2nd Guards Tank Army (HQ Fürstenberg) · Soviet 1st Mechanized Corps, 9th Tank Corps, 12th Guards Tank Corps
 4th Guards Tank Army (HQ Eberswalde) · 5th Guards Mechanised Corps, 6th Guards Mechanised Corps ; 10th Guards Tank Corps
 2nd Shock Army (HQ Goldberg, then Schwerin) · 109th Rifle Corps (46th, 90th, 372nd Rifle Divisions), 116th Rifle Corps (86th, 321st, 326th Rifle Division), 40th Guards Rifle Corps (101st Guards, 102nd Guards, 272nd Rifle Division)
 3rd Shock Army (HQ Stendal) · 7th Rifle Corps (146th, 265th, 364th Rifle Divisions) ; 12th Guards Rifle Corps (23rd Guards, 52nd Guards, 33rd Rifle Divisions); 79th Rifle Corps (150th, 171st, 207th Rifle Divisions) 9th Tank Corps
 5th Shock Army (HQ Nauen, then Potsdam) · 9th Rifle Corps (248th, 301st Rifle Divisions); 26th Guards Rifle Corps (89th Guards, 94th Guards, 266th Rifle Divisions); 32nd Rifle Corps (60th Guards, 295th, 416th Rifle Divisions); 230th Rifle Division; three independent tank brigades
 8th Guards Army (HQ Jena, then Nohra) 4th Guards Rifle Corps (35th, 47th, 57th Guard Rifle Divisions) · 28th Guards Rifle Corps (39th, 79th, 88th Guards Rifle Divisions) · 29th Guards Rifle Corps (27th, 74th, 82nd Guards Rifle Divisions) · 11th Tank Corps
 47th Army (HQ Eisleben, then Halle) · 77th Rifle Corps (185th, 260th, 328th Rifle Division) · 125th Rifle Corps (60th, 76th, 175th Rifle Divisions) · 129th Rifle Corps (82nd, 132nd, 143rd Rifle Divisions) · 1st Guards Tank Corps and the 25th Tank Corps.
 49th Army (HQ Wittenberg)
 70th Army (HQ Rostock)
 First Polish Army (two divisions)
 Dnieper Flotilla
 16th Air Army (HQ Woltersdorf)

The 4th Artillery Corps also became part of the GSFG in 1945. 

An order of 29 May 1945 had ordered the disestablishment of the 47th, 77th, 80th, 89th, 25th, 61st, 91st, 16th, 38th, 62nd, 70th, 121st, and 114th Rifle Corps, and of the 71st, 136th, 162nd, 76th, 82nd, 212th, 356th, 234th, 23rd, 397th, 311th, 415th, 328th, 274th, 370th, 41st, 134th, 312th, 4th, 117th, 247th, 89th, 95th, 64th, 323rd, 362nd, 222nd, 49th, 339th, 383rd, 191st, 380th, 42nd, 139th, 238th, 385th, 200th, 330th, 199th, 1st, 369th, 165th, 169th, 158th, and 346th Rifle Divisions. The 89th Rifle Division was not disbanded and instead transferred to the Caucasus.

In January 1946, the 2nd Shock Army left the Soviet Zone. A month later, the 47th Army was disbanded, with its units withdrawn to the Soviet Union. In October the 5th Shock Army was disbanded. In 1947 the 3rd and 4th Guards Mechanized Divisions (Mobilization), former mechanized armies, arrived in the group from the Central Group of Forces. In 1954 the 3rd Shock Army became the 3rd Red Banner Combined Arms Army. The 3rd Guards Mechanized Army became the 18th Guards Army on 29 April 1957. On the same day, the 4th Guards Mechanized Army became the 20th Guards Army. 

After the abolition of the occupation functions in 1954, the Group of Soviet Occupation Forces in Germany became known as the Group of Soviet Forces in Germany (GSVG) on 24 March. The legal basis for the GSVG's stay in East Germany was the Treaty on Relations between the USSR and the GDR of 1955.

Withdrawals from East Germany in 1956 and 1957/58 comprised more than 70,000 Soviet army personnel, including 18th Guards Army Staff.

The GSFG had the task to ensure for the adherence to the regulations of the Potsdam Agreement. Furthermore, they represented the political and military interests of the Soviet Union. In 1957 an agreement between the governments of the USSR and the GDR laid out the arrangements over the temporary stay of Soviet armed forces on the territory of the GDR, the numerical strength of the Soviet troops, and their assigned posts and exercise areas. It was specified that the Soviet armed forces were not to interfere into the internal affairs of the GDR, as they had done during the East German uprising of 1953.

Following a resolution of the government of the Soviet Union in 1979 and 1980, 20,000 army personnel, 1,000 tanks and much equipment were withdrawn from the territory of the GDR, among them the 6th Guards Tank Division, with headquarters at Wittenberg.

In the course of Perestroika the GSFG was realigned as a more defensive force regarding strength, structure and equipment. This entailed a clear reduction of the tank forces in 1989. The GSFG was renamed the Western Group of Forces on 1 June 1989. The withdrawal of the GSFG was one of the largest peacetime troop transfers in military history. Despite the difficulties, which resulted from the dissolution of the Soviet Union in the same period, the departure was carried out according to plan and punctually until August 1994. Between the years of 1992 and 1993, the Western Group of Forces in Germany (along with the Northern Group of Forces) halted military exercises.

The return of the troops and material took place particularly by the sea route by means of the ports in Rostock and the island of Rügen, as well as via Poland. The Russian Ground Forces left Germany on 25 June 1994 with a military parade of the 6th Guards Motor Rifle Brigade in Berlin. The parting ceremony in Wünsdorf on 11 June 1994 and in the Treptow Park in Berlin on 31 August 1994 marked the end of the Russian military presence on German soil.

In addition to German territories, the Group of Soviet Forces in Germany operational territory also included the region of town of Szczecin, part of the territories transferred from Germany to Poland following the end of the Second World War. The rest of Poland fell under the Northern Group of Forces, while the southern regions (Austria, Czechoslovakia) were under the Central Group of Forces.

Generals directing the withdrawals from Germany diverted arms, equipment, and foreign monies intended to build housing in Russia for the withdrawn troops. Several years later, the last GSFG commander, General Matvei Burlakov, and the Defence Minister, Pavel Grachev, had their involvement exposed. They were also accused of ordering the murder of reporter Dmitry Kholodov, who had been investigating the scandals.

Structure and equipment in 1991

The Soviet troops occupied 777 barracks at 276 locations on the territory of the German Democratic Republic. This also included 47 airfields and 116 exercise areas. At the beginning of 1991 there were still about 338,000 soldiers in 24 divisions, distributed among five land armies and an air army in what was by then the Western Group of Forces. In addition, there were about 208,000 relatives of officers as well as civil employees, among them about 90,000 children. Most locations were in the area of today's Brandenburg.

In 1991 there were approximately 4,200 tanks, 8,200 armored vehicles, 3,600 artillery pieces, 106,000 other motor vehicles, 690 aircraft, 680 helicopters, and 180 rocket systems.
See also

At the end of the 1980s, the primary Soviet formations included:
1st Guards Tank Red Banner Army – Dresden
9th Tank Division – Riesa
11th Guards Tank Division – Dresden
20th Guards Motor Rifle Division – Grimma
2nd Guards Tank Army – Fürstenberg/Havel
16th Guards Tank Division – Neustrelitz
21st Motor Rifle Division – Perleberg
94th Guards Motor Rifle Division – Schwerin
207th Motor Rifle Division – Stendal (note; earlier Western reporting lists this as a Guards unit; this is incorrect)
3rd Red Banner Army – Magdeburg (as of 1988)
7th Guards Tank Division – Dessau-Rosslau
10th Guards Uralsko-Lvovskaya Tank Division – Altengrabow
12th Guards Tank Division – Neuruppin
47th Guards Tank Division – Hillersleben
8th Guards Order of Lenin Army – Weimar-Nohra
27th Guards Motor Rifle Division – Halle
39th Guards Motor Rifle Division – Ohrdruf
57th Guards Motor Rifle Division – Naumburg
79th Guards Tank Division – Jena
20th Guards Red Banner Army – Eberswalde
25th Tank Division – Vogelsang
32nd Guards Tank Division – Jüterbog
35th Motor Rifle Division – Krampnitz
90th Guards Tank Division – Bernau bei Berlin
16th Air Army – Zossen
6th Guards Fighter Aviation Division – Merseburg
16th Guards Fighter Aviation Division – Ribnitz-Damgarten. Withdrawn 30 October 1993 to Millerovo, North Caucasus Military District, and joined 4th Air Army.
105th Fighter-Bomber Aviation Division – Großenhain
125th Fighter-Bomber Aviation Division – Rechlin [town, not in airfield] – disbanded July 1993 or October 1993.
126th Fighter Aviation Division – Zerbst

Other Group-level formations included:
6th Separate Guards Motor Rifle Brigade (Karlshorst, Berlin) - withdrawn to Kursk in 1994
35th Guards Air Assault Brigade (effectively an airmobile brigade; Cottbus, Germany, activated October 1979, and transferred to Kapchagay, Kazakh SSR, in April 1991. Eventually became part of the Kazakh Armed Forces).
34th Guards Artillery Division (Potsdam) (formed 25 June 1945 to 9 July 1945 in Germany)

Commanders-in-Chief of the GSFG 

The first three Commanders-in-Chief were also Chiefs of the Soviet Military Administration in Germany.

GSOFG, 1945–54

GSFG, 1954–88

WGF, 1988–94

WGF military soviet
Members (June 1993):
 Commander-in-Chief of the WGF – Colonel general М. P. Burlakov
 1st deputy commander-in-Chief of the WGF – Colonel general A. N. Mityukhin
 Deputy commander-in-Chief of the WGF for the withdrawal of forces – Lieutenant general С. В. Тshernilevsky
 WGF chief of staff – Lieutenant general A. V. Teretev
 Deputy commander-in-Chief of the WGF for logistics – Lieutenant general W. I. Isakow
 Deputy commander-in-Chief of the EGF for armaments – Major general W. N. Shulikov
 Commander of the 16th Air Army – Lieutenant general A. F. Tarasenko

See also 
List of Soviet divisions 1917–45
List of Soviet Army divisions 1989–91
United States Army Europe
United States Forces Japan
United States Forces Korea

Notes

References

Further reading
William Durie, " The United States Garrison Berlin 1945-1994", (Mission Accomplished, Aug 2014  (English).

Scott and Scott, The Armed Forces of the USSR, Westview Press, Boulder, Colorado, 1979
Roter Stern über Deutschland, Ilko-Sascha Kowalczuk und Stefan Wolle, Ch. Links Verlag, Berlin, 2001, . This German book, The Red Star over Germany, Soviet troops in the GDR, presents 49 years of the Soviet Army stationed in East Germany.

External links 
BRIXMIS (British Liaison Mission to GSFG)
U.S. Military Liaison Mission memorial site, Group of Soviet Forces in Germany
German Armed Forces Military History Research Office, Database of GSFG and NPA locations 
The GSVG : Group of Soviet Forces in Germany 
GSFG  
The Group of Soviet Forces in Germany

Germany
Allied occupation of Germany
Soviet occupation zone
Germany–Soviet Union relations
Cold War military history of Germany
Military units and formations established in 1945
Military units and formations disestablished in 1994
Perestroika
Military history of East Germany
Military history of the Soviet Union
East Germany–Soviet Union relations
 
1945 establishments in Germany
1994 disestablishments in Germany